"Throw Ya Hands Up" is a song recorded by Canadian band Stereos, which features vocals from rapper Jhevon Paris. It is the Stereos' second single from their self-titled debut album. It was released digitally on September 1, 2009. On the issue dated September 19, 2009, the song debuted on the Canadian Hot 100 at number three.

Music video
The music video was shot in Miami, Florida. It starts off with the Stereos performing by the shore of Watson Island near the MacArthur Causeway. Other settings in the video include a pool party, a yacht, and other various locations at midnight.

Charts

Weekly charts

Year-end charts

Certification

References

2009 singles
Stereos songs
Song recordings produced by Gavin Brown (musician)
2009 songs
Universal Music Group singles